Cayce may refer to:

Places
 Cayce, Kentucky
 Cayce, Mississippi
 Cayce, South Carolina
 James A. Cayce Homes, a housing project in Nashville, Tennessee, U.S.

People
 Edgar Cayce (1877–1945), American psychic, also notable for his thoughts on health and nutrition
 Marc Cayce (born 1976), American film writer and director

In fiction
Cayce Pollard, protagonist of William Gibson's 2003 novel Pattern Recognition